Mary Pierce was the defending champion, but did not compete this year.

Eighth-seeded Klára Koukalová won the title by defeating Lucie Šafářová 3–6, 6–2, 6–2 in the final.

Seeds
The top two seeds receive a bye into the second round.

Draw

Finals

Top half

Bottom half

References
 Main draw

Rosmalen Grass Court Championships
2005 WTA Tour